Jonu station is a station on Chŏllima Line of the Pyongyang Metro. It is located a short distance from Chonsung station.

This station was renovated in 2020, featuring TVs and electronic displays.

References

External links
 

Railway stations opened in 1973
Pyongyang Metro stations
1973 establishments in North Korea